Oligonucleotidase (oligoribonuclease) is an exoribonuclease derived from Flammulina velutipes. This enzyme catalyses the following chemical reaction

 3'-end directed exonucleolytic cleavage of viral RNA-DNA hybrid

References

External links
 
 

EC 3.1.13